The bathyscaphe Archimède is a deep diving research submersible of the French Navy. It used  of hexane as the gasoline buoyancy of its float. It was designed by Pierre Willm and Georges Houot.

Archimède was christened on 27 July 1961, at the French Navy base of Toulon. It was designed to go beyond , and displaced 61 tons. In October 1961, Archimède passed its first dive tests, diving to  unmanned.

On 15 July 1962, Archimède descended to  into the Kurile-Kamchatcha Trench, making it the second deepest dive ever, at that point in time, second only to the  dive on the Challenger Deep.

Archimède explored the Mid-Atlantic Ridge jointly with the submarine Cyana and submersible , in Project FAMOUS (French-American Mid-Ocean Undersea Study) in 1974.

Archimède operated until the 1970s. It was placed on reserve in 1975, and decommissioned in 1978.

Since 2001, Archimède is on display at the Cité de la Mer museum in Cherbourg.

Archimède was honoured with a stamp in Palau.

References

External links

Bathyscaphes
Submarines of France
Ships built in France
Deep-submergence vehicles
1961 ships

fr:Bathyscaphe#Les différents bathyscaphes